Dafna Dekel (born 7 May 1966, in Ashdod, Israel) is an Israeli singer, actress and television personality.

Biography
Dafna Dekel was born in Ashdod, Israel, to a family of Yemenite-Jewish descent. She was discovered while serving in the Nahal entertainment troupe of the  Israel Defense Forces in 1985-1986. After her release from the army, Dekel was cast in the Israeli musical Salah Shabati produced in honor of Israel's 40th anniversary. In 1989, she released her first self-titled album. Although the album had 4 songs written and/or composed by Dekel, her biggest hits were songs written for her by others. In 1989, she sang in the children's holiday show "Festigal" with the song "Mah koreh li?" (What's happening to me?) and performed a Yemenite medley with the Yosefi Sisters and Margalit Tzan'ani.

In 1992, Dekel won the "Kdam" (the Israeli pre-selection to the Eurovision Song Contest with  "Zeh raq sport" (It's just sports). Dekel represented Israel in Sweden, winning 85 points and reaching 6th place. For the next three years, she was a regular on "Pilei Klaim" (Stage Wonders), a popular children's show. She released her second self-titled album in 1994.

She took part in the 1995 Festigal, coming in third, and the 1999 Festigal. Dekel also hosted the Eurovision Song Contest 1999 held in Jerusalem, along with Yigal Ravid and Sigal Shachmon. She appeared in several children's videos and then hosted "Dafna and Doo-Di-Doo," a television show for children.

In 2001, Dekel starred in the musical "Shilgiya" (Snow White) and composed the songs. Towards the end of the run, she continued to perform despite the death of her mother.  She appeared in "Agadat Deshe" (A Grass Tale), a drama series that ran for two seasons.

In March 2008, Dafna Dekel released the single "Yoman yakar" (Dear Diary), the first song from her third album "Yoman" (diary). She wrote and composed most of the lyrics in collaboration with her brothers, who are also musicians.

See also
 List of Eurovision Song Contest presenters

References

External links

 

1966 births
Living people
21st-century Israeli women singers
People from Ashdod
Eurovision Song Contest entrants for Israel
Eurovision Song Contest entrants of 1992
20th-century Israeli women singers
Israeli people of Yemeni-Jewish descent
Jewish singers
21st-century Yemeni women singers
Yemenite Jews
20th-century Yemeni women singers